The 2019 Malaysia Challenge Cup or Challenge Cup (Malay: Piala Cabaran Malaysia 2019) is the second edition of Malaysia Challenge Cup tournament organised by Football Association of Malaysia (FAM) and Malaysian Football League (MFL).

The 2019 Malaysia Challenge Cup will start with a preliminary round. A total of 7 teams took part in the competition. The teams were divided into two groups, one group containing four teams and another with three teams. The group leaders and runners-up teams in the groups after four or six matches qualified to the semi-finals.

Format
The competition will be one involving eight teams-one team from Malaysia Super League (12th placed team), seven teams from Malaysia Premier League (6th to 12th placed teams). However, due to the fact that Perlis were thrown out of the league, there are no teams will be invited into the Challenge Cup to replace them.

Round and draw dates 
The draw for the 2019 Malaysia Challenge Cup was held on 23 July 2019.

Group stage

Group A

Group B

Knockout stage

Bracket

Semifinals

Semi-finals

First Leg

Second Leg

Johor Darul Ta'zim II won 4−2 on aggregate. 

First Leg

Second Leg

UKM won 7−1 on aggregate.

Final
The first legs will be played on  4 October 2019, and the second legs will be played on 12 October 2019

1−1 on aggregate. Johor Darul Ta'zim II won 6−5 on penalty after extra time.

Statistics

Top scorers

Top assists
Players sorted first by assists, then by last name.

Hat-tricks

Clean sheets

See also
2019 Malaysia FA Cup
2019 Malaysia Cup

References

External links
 

2019 in Malaysian football